Vanik may refer to:

 Vanik (fictional character) in The Adventures of Alix
 Charles Vanik (1913-2007), US politician
 Vanik (caste), an Indian social group